Heidi Murkoff, nee Eisenberg (born 1958), is the author of the What to Expect When You're Expecting series of pregnancy guides. She is also the creator of WhatToExpect.com and founder of the What to Expect Foundation.

What to Expect series
Murkoff conceived the idea for What to Expect When You're Expecting during her first pregnancy, when she couldn't find answers to her questions or reassurance for her worries in the books she’d turned to for advice. Determined to write a guide that would help other expectant parents sleep better at night, Murkoff delivered the proposal for What to Expect When You're Expecting hours before delivering her daughter.

WhatToExpect.com 

In 2005, Murkoff expanded the What to Expect (WTE) brand online with www.whattoexpect.com as a companion to the books. In 2009, WTE went mobile with the WTE Pregnancy Tracker, the WTE Fertility Tracker, the WTE Baby Name Finder, and the WTE First Year Tracker.

What to Expect Foundation
Murkoff created the What to Expect Foundation along with Lisa Bernstein as a nonprofit organization dedicated to helping underserved families have healthy pregnancies, safe deliveries, and healthy babies. The WTE Foundation's Baby Basics program has helped over 500,000 expectant moms-to-be in need and their babies and is currently preparing a global initiative in an effort to help moms in need around the world.

Media
Murkoff has appeared on The Today Show, Good Morning America, The CBS Early Show, Oprah, BBC Breakfast, and Good Morning Australia.

Awards 
In 2005, she was inducted into the Books For A Better Life Hall of Fame.

Time magazine named Murkoff one of the 100 Most Influential People in the World for 2011.

Personal life
Murkoff and her husband, Erik, have two children and one grandchild and live in Southern California. 
Murkoff's father Howard Eisenberg established the Arlene Eisenberg Memorial Fund with ASJA, providing specialized awards to bestselling books making a difference in motherhood.

References

American non-fiction writers
Living people
1958 births